Lanitza is a locality south of Grafton on the Orara Way in northern New South Wales, Australia. The North Coast railway passes through, and a railway station and sidings were provided from 1915 to 1974. At the 2006 census, Lanitza had a population of 134 people.

References

Towns in New South Wales
Northern Rivers
North Coast railway line, New South Wales
Clarence Valley Council